Cottage Economy is a book by William Cobbett, first  published in 1821, which covers many practical instructions such how to bake bread, brew beer, keep livestock and "other matters deemed useful in the conducting of the Affairs of a Labourer's Family" with the aim of aiding the "Labouring Classes" in having a "good living". It is considered to be a timeless guide on matters of self-sufficiency.

References

External links
  
 

English non-fiction books